Cinquetti is an Italian surname. Notable people with the surname include:

Arnaldo Cinquetti (born 1953), Italian swimmer
Gigliola Cinquetti (born 1947), Italian singer, songwriter, actress, and television presenter

Italian-language surnames